Candi Patrice Mundon King is an American politician who has served as a Democratic member of the Virginia House of Delegates since 2021.

Biography

King obtained a bachelor's degree in political science from Norfolk State University. She has worked as a nonprofit program manager and an education advocate.

Political career

2021
King announced her campaign for delegate in December 2020, shortly after her predecessor Jennifer Carroll Foy resigned to run for governor, causing a special election. After winning the Democratic primary, King faced Republican Heather Mitchell in the general election on January 5, 2021. King won with 51.5% of the vote, with a margin of 263 votes.

King's re-election involved a primary challenge from Prince William County resident Pamela Montgomery. The race became one of the most expensive primaries in the state because of money contributed by clean energy group Clean Virginia and utility provider Dominion Energy. Despite the flood of outside money, King won with 67.77%-32.23%.

In the November General Election, King ran successfully won a full term against Republican Gina Ciarcia, a history teacher at a private Christian school.

Legislative Accomplishments

Election results

References

Democratic Party members of the Virginia House of Delegates
21st-century American politicians
African-American state legislators in Virginia
Living people
Year of birth missing (living people)
Norfolk State University alumni
21st-century American women politicians
African-American women in politics
Women state legislators in Virginia
21st-century African-American women
21st-century African-American politicians